by K. Kosako is a BSD licensed regular expression library that supports a variety of character encodings. The Ruby programming language, in version 1.9, as well as PHP's multi-byte string module (since PHP5), use Oniguruma as their regular expression engine.  It is also used in products such as Atom, EDK2 UEFI, GyazMail, Take Command Console, Tera Term, TextMate and SubEthaEdit.

There is also a forked Oniguruma version called "Onigmo" (Oniguruma-mod) which includes some features introduced in Perl 5.10+.  Ruby since version 2.0 has also switched to it and features have been backported from ruby to Onigmo. Take Command Console since version 20 has also switched to Onigmo.

See also
 Comparison of regular expression engines

References

External links
 
 Archive of Oniguruma Homepage as of August 7, 2015

Regular expressions
Software using the BSD license